Samma Satta (Also spelled Samasatta or Samasata) is a town in Bahawalpur District, Punjab, Pakistan.

Railway
Samasata Junction railway station is located in middle of the Samasata town on the main railway line of Pakistan Railways. It was the junction of Samasata-Amruka via Bahawalnagar branch railway line. The train service on this branch railway line was closed in July 2011. This station is staffed and has booking office. It is the stop of some express trains.

Notables 
Samasata is renowned for its sweet Barfi

References

Populated places in Bahawalpur District